William Paul Constantino (August 19, 1911 – July 29, 1989) was an American state legislator who was a justice of Clinton District Court and a member of the Massachusetts House of Representatives.

Personal life
Constantino was born on August 19, 1911 in Clinton, Massachusetts. He graduated from Clinton High School in 1928, Harvard College in 1932, and Harvard Law School in 1935. His son, William P. Constantino Jr., also served in the Massachusetts House. His grandson, Mike Bonin, was elected to the Los Angeles City Council in 2014.

Political career
From 1936 to 1939, Constantino was Clinton's town solicitor. In 1938 he was an unsuccessful candidate for Republican nomination for the United States House of Representatives seat in Massachusetts's 3rd congressional district.

Constantino was a member of the United States Army during World War II. He served in Europe, Africa, and the Middle East. He started as an enlisted man in anti-aircraft and rose to second lieutenant in the 78th Infantry Division. He was a member of the 78th during the Battle of the Bulge. His final assignment was as a first lieutenant in military government.

From 1946 to 1947, Constantino once again served as town solicitor. From 1947 to 1951 he was a member of the Massachusetts Civil Service Commission. From 1951 to 1954 he represented the 11th Worcester District in the Massachusetts House of Representatives. In 1954, Constantino was the Republican nominee for Massachusetts State Auditor. He lost to incumbent Thomas J. Buckley 59% to 40%.

Judicial career
From 1954 until his retirement in 1981, Constantino was presiding justice of Clinton District Court. In 1959, he was also appointed to the Worcester Superior Court.

Constantino died on July 29, 1989 in Marlborough, Massachusetts. He was survived by his wife and four children, one of whom, William Constantino Jr., also served as a state representative.

See also
 1951–1952 Massachusetts legislature
 1953–1954 Massachusetts legislature

References

1911 births
1989 deaths
20th-century American politicians
Massachusetts state court judges
Republican Party members of the Massachusetts House of Representatives
People from Clinton, Massachusetts
Harvard Law School alumni
20th-century American judges